Karmanovo (Qarman) is a rural locality (a selo) and the administrative centre of Karmanovsky Selsoviet, Yanaulsky District, Bashkortostan, Russia. The population was 1,251 as of 2010. There are 30 streets.

Geography 
Karmanovo is located 29 km west of Yanaul (the district's administrative centre) by road. Karmanovo (village) is the nearest rural locality.

References 

Rural localities in Yanaulsky District